The 2010–11 UEFA Futsal Cup was the 25th edition of Europe's premier club futsal tournament and the 10th edition under the current UEFA Futsal Cup format.

Teams

Preliminary round

Group A (Kaunas – LTU)

Group B (Cospicua – MLT)

Group C (Vienna – AUT)

Group D (Nicosia – CYP)

Group E (Skopje – MKD)

Group F (Győr – HUN)

Group G (Hafnarfjörður – ISL)

Main round

Group 1

Group 2

Group 3

Group 4

Group 5

Group 6

Elite round

Group 1

Group 2

Group 3

Group 4

Final four
The following teams have qualified for the Final Four round:
 Benfica
 Kairat
 Montesilvano
 Sporting CP

Semi-finals

Final 3rd and 4th

Final

External links
 Official UEFA Futsal Cup website

References

UEFA Futsal Champions League
Cup